Khryug is a rural locality (a selo) in Khryugsky Selsoviet, Akhtynsky District, Republic of Dagestan, Russia. The population was 2,241 as of 2010. There are 4 streets.

Geography
Khryug is located 14 km northwest of Akhty (the district's administrative centre) by road. Kaka is the nearest rural locality.

References 

Rural localities in Akhtynsky District